Kroksjön is a small lake southwest of the city of Skellefteå, Sweden. There is a sawmill and a couple of holiday cottages around the lake. During the last couple of years more and more people are starting to live there all year round.

References

Lakes of Västerbotten County